Charles Ssekyaaya is a Ugandan weightlifter. He competed at the 2012 Summer Olympics in the Men's 62 kg, finishing 13th.

References

Ugandan male weightlifters
Living people
Olympic weightlifters of Uganda
Weightlifters at the 2012 Summer Olympics
Weightlifters at the 2010 Summer Youth Olympics
1994 births
20th-century Ugandan people
21st-century Ugandan people